Knut Kircher (born 2 February 1969) is a former German football referee who is based in Rottenburg am Neckar. He refereed for TSV Hirschau of the Württemberg Football Association.

Refereeing career
In 1998, he became a referee in the 2. Bundesliga. Kircher was then promoted to referee in the German Bundesliga for the 2001–02 season. In 2004, he became a FIFA referee. He officiated his first match on 8 September 2004; the World Cup qualifying match between Andorra and Romania (1–5).

Kircher retired from officiating in 2016 because he reached the age limit for German referees, which is 47. His final Bundesliga match officiated was between Bayern Munich and Hannover 96.

Personal life
Kircher studied at and graduated from the University Albstadt-Sigmaringen engineering department. He lives in Rottenburg, and is married with three children. His main job is working at Daimler AG, where he lectures.

References

External links
 Profile at worldfootball.net
 Interview with Knut Kicher at sueddeutsche.de 

1969 births
Living people
German football referees
People from Amberg-Sulzbach
Sportspeople from the Upper Palatinate
UEFA Europa League referees
20th-century German people
21st-century German people